Philip Sheppard (born 4 November 1969) is an English musician.

Career

Film soundtracks

In 2017, Sheppard created with director Greg Barker and producer John Battsek to release, The Final Year, which premiered at the 2017 Toronto Film Festival, and Legion of Brothers, which premiered at the 2017 Sundance Film Festival. Sheppard also composed the original score for Chosen, starring Harvey Keitel. In 2018, Sheppard collaborated again with director David Sington, who he worked with on In the Shadow of the Moon, on the Netflix original documentary, Mercury 13, which premiered at the 2018 San Francisco International Film Festival.

Solo albums and collaborations

In 2017, Sheppard collaborated with Odesza on their album, A Moment Apart, which was nominated for Best Dance/Electronic Album and the single “Line of Sight” featuring WYNNE & Mansionair was nominated for Best Dance Recording at the 60th Annual GRAMMY Awards A Moment Apart. Sheppard is featured on the strings for A Moment Apart and Just A Memory. In 2018 Sheppard released his sophomore solo orchestral album, Fall From Earth, on June 22, 2018.

Keynotes
Sheppard has delivered keynotes in confrences such as C2MTL. e.g. conference, Business Innovation Factory, and The How To Academy.

Bibliography 

Sheppard, Philip. 2008. Music Makes Your Child Smarter: How Music Helps Every Child's Development. (
). Schirmer Trade Books.

References

External links
 Philip Sheppard website
 

Living people
English cellists
English composers
English conductors (music)
British male conductors (music)
Alumni of the Royal Academy of Music
Place of birth missing (living people)
Academics of the Royal Academy of Music
1969 births
21st-century British conductors (music)
21st-century British male musicians
21st-century cellists